= Spaj Atkinson =

- Born: 1899
- Died: 1964 (aged 64–65)
- Known for: Butterfly Wings Art
- Style: Butterfly Wings, Watercolour

Harold Arthur James "Spaj" Atkinson (born 1899 - 1964) was an English artist, known for his Butterfly Wing art.

== Early life ==
Spaj Atkinson was born in 1899 in Britain. Atkinson suffered from several severe disablities including deafness, blindness, and paralysis, all following an accident. "known as “Spaj” because as a child he was small like a sparrow; he was deaf and blind in one eye but produced wonderful art, using butterfly wings."

== Work ==
Atkinson created fantasy like work, where he would use the real wings of butterflies mixed with watercolour paintings to craft fantasy-like paintings.
